In homotopy theory, phantom maps are continuous maps  of CW-complexes for which the restriction of  to any finite subcomplex  is inessential (i.e., nullhomotopic).  produced the first known nontrivial example of such a map with  finite-dimensional (answering a question of Paul Olum). Similar constructions are defined for maps of spectra.

References

Homotopy theory